The Dublin and South Eastern Railway (DSER), often referred to as the Slow and Easy, was an Irish gauge railway in Ireland from 1846 to 1925. It carried 4,626,226 passengers in 1911. The company previously traded under the names Waterford, Wexford, Wicklow & Dublin Railway (WWW&DR or 3WS) to 1848, Dublin and Wicklow Raillway (D&WR) to 1860 and Dublin, Wicklow and Wexford Railway (DW&WR) until 1906.

The DSER joined with the Great Southern Railway on 1 January 1925, the resultant company being known as Great Southern Railways.

History
It was incorporated by Act of Parliament in 1846 as the "Waterford, Wexford, Wicklow and Dublin Railway Company". In 1860 it was renamed the "Dublin, Wicklow and Wexford Railway Company" and on 31 December 1906 it was renamed again as the DSER. Amongst the lines forming the DSER was the Dublin and Kingstown Railway, which was authorised in 1831 and opened in 1834 – the first public railway in Ireland. The Kingstown – Dalkey section was operated by atmospheric traction for a short while. The railway formed part of the Royal Mail route between London and Dublin via Dún Laoghaire railway station at Kingstown (now Dún Laoghaire).

The DSER was much affected by the Irish Civil War including 31 major incidents. When added to shortages and inflationary costs arising from and after the First World War the DSER found itself, in common with other railway companies in Ireland, in difficult financial and operational conditions.

A railway bill of 1924 attempted to amalgamate the Great Southern and Western Railway (GS&WR), Midland Great Western Railway (MGWR) and DSER into the Great Southern Railway whose networks were entirely within the Irish Free State. The DSER, being part British owned, stayed out of the merger which occurred on 12 November 1924, with a preference to merge with the Great Northern Railway of Ireland (GNRI) which covered lines north from Dublin and throughout the North of Ireland. The DSER finally merged with the Great Southern Railway to form the Great Southern Railways (GSR) on 1 January 1925.

Predecessors and extensions

Dublin and Kingstown Railway

The Dublin and Kingstown Railway (D&KR) was Ireland's first railway. It linked Westland Row in Dublin with Kingstown Harbour in County Dublin. It was authorised in 1831, and the first part of the line running from Dublin to Kingstown Pier was opened on 17 December 1834, with an extension to  Kingstown ( Dún Laoghaire station's current location) opened on 13 May 1837.

Dalkey Atmospheric Railway

The Dalkey Atmospheric Railway was an extension of the Dublin and Kingstown Railway to Atmospheric Road in Dalkey in County Dublin. It was unofficially opened as far as Sandycove on 19 August 1843. The route from Sandycove to Dalkey (atmospheric station) was opened on 19 March 1844, in time for the official opening of the on 29 March 1844. It used part of the Dalkey Quarry industrial tramway, which was earlier used for the construction of Kingstown (Dún Laoghaire) Harbour. It was the first railway of its type in the world.

Dublin and Wicklow Railway Company

The entity that became the DSER was incorporated by Act of Parliament in 1846 as the "Waterford, Wexford, Wicklow and Dublin Railway Company", with the name changing to Dublin and Wicklow Railway at the same time. They leased the Dublin and Kingstown railway in 1854, converted it from  gauge to their  gauge. The remainder of the line to Wexford was opened over the next 20 years in stages.

The line to Harcourt Road (later ) became the main line while the line to Westland Row became the branch until it was double tracked in 1882 and became a second main line. Coastal erosion has been a problem on the route to Wicklow, forcing the opening of a deviation between Ballybrack and Bray on 1 October 1915, and numerous deviations between Bray and Wicklow.

In 1860 it was renamed the "Dublin, Wicklow and Wexford Railway Company" in keeping with the southwards expansion of the railway.

Dublin, Wicklow and Wexford Railway Company
At this time the line from Wicklow Junction to the Murrough station was bypassed. It remained in use as a freight station and saw occasional passenger services.

In the early 1870s the route was finally completed to Wexford. The route from Enniscorthy to the original Wexford Station (Carcur) was opened on 17 August 1872. It was extended to Wexford North, the current station, in August 1874.

Branch To Waterford
A branch was opened to New Ross in 1887. This left the main line at Macmine near Wexford. It was extended from New Ross to Waterford in 1904. This extension connected with the Great Southern and Western Railway, which in turn connected with trains for the south of Ireland.

City of Dublin Junction Railway
The City of Dublin Junction railway opened on 1 May 1891. This connected the DW&W at Westland Row station with Amiens Street station in the north of the city.

Network and Infrastructure
It also owned the Marine Station Hotel at Bray and the Grand Central Hotel at Rathdrum, south of Wicklow.

Grand Canal Street railway works

The locomotive workshop for the DSER was the Grand Canal Street railway works, also known as The Factory, a two-storey converted distillery at Grand Canal Street, Dublin.  With no lifting crane and poor workshop layout the works was increasingly stretched by larger locomotives and the shortages from the First World War and damages due to the Irish Civil War.

Rolling Stock
According to the Railway Year Book 1912, the railway operated 60 locomotives, hauling 253 passenger coaches and 1,005 goods vehicles. The locomotives were painted black picked out with red bands and gold lines, while the passenger vehicles were crimson lake with gold lines.

One DSER steam locomotive is preserved: a 2-6-0 goods locomotive No. 15 (later Great Southern Railways No. 461) owned by the Railway Preservation Society of Ireland at Whitehead, County Antrim.

Accidents and incidents

A derailment on 9 August 1867 at the Brandy Hole Viaduct resulted in the train and most of the coaches falling into the sea below. Two passengers were killed, and there were a further 25 injuries.

On 20 February 1900, a cattle train overran buffers at  station, Dublin.

See also
 Dublin-Rosslare railway line
 Harcourt Street railway line
 History of rail transport in Ireland

References

Further reading

External links
 No. 461 at Whitehead

Defunct railway companies of Ireland
Irish gauge railways
Railway companies disestablished in 1925